Florida is an dispersed rural community in Kennedy Township, Unorganized North Part of Cochrane District, Ontario, Canada. It is on the Sucker River, a right tributary of the Abitibi River.

History
Florida had a post office from 1927 to 1931, and from 1936 to 1942.

A chapter of the Federated Women's Institutes of Ontario was located in Florida from 1939 to 1945.

References

Municipalities in Cochrane District